The 2014 WNBA season is the 15th season for the Seattle Storm of the Women's National Basketball Association.

Transactions

WNBA Draft
The following are the Storm's selections in the 2014 WNBA Draft.

Transaction log
 April 14, 2014 Bria Hartley and Tianna Hawkins traded to Washington Mystics for Crystal Langhorne
April 21, 2014 Jasmine Lister, Taylor Hall, Mikaela Ruef,  Chelsea Douglas signed to training camp contracts
April 22, 2014 Valencia McFarland signed to training camp contract
April 24, 2014 Charde Houston waived
April 25, 2014 Michelle Plouffe signed to training camp contract
April 28, 2014 Alysha Clark contract signed
May 3, 2014, Joslyn Tinkle, Chelsea Douglas, Taylor Hall waived
May 6, 2014 Valencia McFarland, Mikaela Ruef waived
May 12, 2014 Jasmine Lister waived
May 14, 2014 Michelle Plouffe waived
May 15, 2014 Nicole Powell contract signed
July 28, 2014 Waltiea Rolle 7-day contract signed 
August 4, 2014 Waltiea Rolle 7-day contract signed 
August 11, 2014 Waltiea Rolle end of season contract signed

Trades

Personnel changes

Additions

Subtractions

Roster

Depth

Season standings

Schedule

Preseason

Regular season

Statistics

Regular season

Awards and honors

References

External links

Seattle Storm seasons
Seattle
2014 in sports in Washington (state)
Seattle Storm